Bertel is a Scandinavian male given name. Notable people named Bertel include:

Bertel Backman (1906–1981), Finnish speed skater who competed in the 1928 Winter Olympics
Bertel Dahlgaard (1887–1972), Danish politician, member of Folketinget for the Social Liberal Party 1920–1960, and statistician
Bertel Flaten (1900–1963), Norwegian politician for the Liberal Party
Bertel Haarder (born 1944), Danish politician
Bertel Jung (1872–1946), Finnish architect and urban planner
Bertel Lauring (1928–2000), Danish film actor
Bertel Thorvaldsen (1770–1844), Danish / Icelandic sculptor

See also
Bertel O. Steen, Norwegian conglomerate with main focus on automotive retailing and import
Dick Bertel, born Dick Bertelmann, a radio and TV personality 1950s to 1980s, and an executive producer for the Voice of America